Guinea-Bissau Creole, also known as Kiriol or Crioulo, is a creole language whose lexicon derives mostly from Portuguese. It is spoken in Guinea Bissau, Senegal and The Gambia.

Guinea-Bissau Creole is spoken as a native tongue by 250,000 Bissau-Guineans and as a second language by 1,000,000.

A variant of Guinea-Bissau Creole is also spoken in southern Senegal, mainly in the region of Casamance, a former Portuguese colony, which is known as Portuguis Creole or Casamance Creole. Creole is the majority language of the inhabitants of the Casamance region and is used as a language of commerce.

Standard Portuguese is the official language of Guinea-Bissau, but Guinea-Bissau Creole is the language of trade, informal literature and entertainment. It is not used in either news media, parliament, public services or educational programming.

History
The creole languages of Upper Guinea are the oldest-known creoles whose lexicons derive heavily from Portuguese. They first appeared around Portuguese settlements established along the northwest coast of Africa; Guinea-Bissau Creole was among these Portuguese-lexified creoles to have emerged. Portuguese merchants and settlers started to mix with locals almost immediately. A small body of settlers called lançados ("the thrown out ones"), contributed to the spread of the Portuguese language and influence by being intermediaries between the Portuguese and natives.

There are three main varieties of this creole in Guinea-Bissau and Senegal: Bissau and Bolama, Bafata, and Cacheu–Ziguinchor.

The creole's substrate language is the language of the local peoples: Mandingas, Manjacos, Pepéis and others, but most of the lexicon (around 80%) comes from Portuguese.

The Portuguese-influenced dialect of Casamance, known as Portuguis Creole or Casamance Creole, similar to the one of Cacheu (Guinea-Bissau) has some influence of French. , Eng. Children of Nobles) speak it, all of them are known, locally, as Purtuguis because they adopt European habits, are Catholics and speak a Creole. They are descendants of Portuguese men and African women. Most of them have Portuguese surnames, such as da Silva, Carvalho or Fonseca. The former Casamance Kingdom made a friendly alliance with the Portuguese and the local king adopted European lifestyle, and there were Portuguese in his court. In 1899, the city was ceded to France and in the middle of the 20th century, the language spread to the surrounding area. After Senegal's independence from France, the Creole people were seen as friends of the French, and discrimination by the more numerous northern Wolof-speaking community started, which has caused Casamance to struggle for independence since 1982. Today, although they continue to struggle, the movement is more placid and learning Portuguese is popular in Casamance because they see it has a link to their past. It is also learned across Senegal since the independence of the country from France. In Senegal, the creole is the first language of at least 46,500 people (1998); it is mainly spoken in Ziguinchor, but there are also speakers in other Casamance cities and in The Gambia.

The use of Guinea-Bissau Creole is still expanding but with growing interference from Portuguese (due to television, literacy, prestige and emigration to Portugal) and African languages (through the migration of speakers of native African languages to the main urban centres of Guinea-Bissau, where the creole is prevalent).

Example
Universal Declaration of Human Rights

Creole: 

Portuguese:   os seres humanos nascem livres e iguais em dignidade e em direitos. Dotados de razão e de consciência, devem agir uns para com os outros em espírito de fraternidade.

English: All human beings are born free and equal in dignity and rights. They are endowed with reason and conscience and should act towards one another in a spirit of brotherhood.

References

Literature

 
 
 
 
 
 
 Sabou Almeida – Crioulu Grammar Made Simple (Peace Corps 1991)
 Luigi Scantamburlo – Dicionário Do Guineense (Fasbeti 2003)

External links

 Guinea-Bissau Creole lessons Memrise

Languages of Senegal
Portuguese-based pidgins and creoles
Languages of Guinea-Bissau
Portuguese language in Africa